"Tutti Frutti" is a song by English band New Order from their tenth studio album, Music Complete (2015). The song was released on 11 December 2015 as the album's second single and features vocals by Elly Jackson of La Roux.

Release
The physical release was preceded by a digital single. The first download single comprised the extended 12” version of "Tutti Frutti" as well as a remix by Hot Chip.

The CD release included the single edit, an alternate 12” mix, and four remixes. A download version of this track listing was also made available through Mute and the band's official webstore. A free download of the Tom Rowlands remix was made available on the band's Soundcloud page on 30 December 2015.

"Tutti Frutti" was released on limited-edition yellow translucent 12-inch vinyl in the United Kingdom and Europe. The Japanese 12-inch single was released on 6 April 2016, and features an exclusive remix by Takkyu Ishino.

Music video
The music video for "Tutti Frutti" was directed by Tom Haines and released in January 2016. The video stars Italian actor Ricky Tognazzi as a delirious television show host.

Track listings

References

2015 singles
2015 songs
Italo disco songs
Mute Records singles
New Order (band) songs
Songs written by Bernard Sumner
Songs written by Stephen Morris (musician)
Songs written by Gillian Gilbert
Songs written by Phil Cunningham (rock musician)